Lebanon is the name of some places in the U.S. state of Wisconsin:
Lebanon, Dodge County, Wisconsin, a town
Lebanon (CDP), Wisconsin, a census-designated place
Old Lebanon, Wisconsin, an unincorporated community
Lebanon, Waupaca County, Wisconsin, a town